Tösh is a village in Kara-Darya rural community, Suzak District, Jalal-Abad Region, Kyrgyzstan. Its population was 4579 in 2021.

References
 

Populated places in Jalal-Abad Region